Tom Opacic (born 7 September 1994) is an Australian professional rugby league footballer who plays as a  for the Hull Kingston Rovers in the Betfred Super League.

He previously played for the Brisbane Broncos, North Queensland Cowboys, and the Parramatta Eels in the National Rugby League.

Background
Opacic was born in Redcliffe, Queensland, Australia, and is of Serbian descent.

He played his junior rugby league for the Redcliffe Dolphins.

Playing career

Early career

In 2013 and 2014, Opacic played for the Brisbane Broncos' NYC team, before graduating to their Queensland Cup team, and his old junior club, Redcliffe Dolphins in 2015.

2016
In Round 16 of the 2016 NRL season, Opacic made his NRL debut for the Brisbane club against the Canterbury-Bankstown Bulldogs. In September, he re-signed with Brisbane on a two-year contract until the end of 2018.

2017
Opacic failed to play a first grade game in 2017, after undergoing two shoulder reconstructions in the summer to treat injuries he suffered in the 2016 finals. During Opacic's recovery, Tautau Moga became one of the first choice centres for Brisbane that year, relegating him to the Queensland Cup that season.

2018
The signing of Jack Bird, as well as the emergence of promising outside backs, Kotoni Staggs and Jamayne Isaako, meant that Opacic spent most of 2018 playing for the Redcliffe Dolphins in the Queensland Cup competition. He scored his only try for the season, coming off the bench in Brisbane's 24-20 win against their rivals, the North Queensland Cowboys, in Round 2. Opacic appeared in 10 games for the Brisbane club in the 2018 season, starting in six and coming off the bench in four.

On 8 August, Opacic re-signed with the Brisbane side on a two-year deal but a month later was released by the club to sign with the North Queensland Cowboys until the end of 2020.

2019
In Round 1 of the 2019 NRL season, Opacic made his club debut for North Queensland in their 24–12 win over the St George Illawarra Dragons. Following a Round 2 defeat by Brisbane, Opacic was dropped to the Townsville Blackhawks. Opacic returned to first grade in North Queensland's Round 8 win over the Gold Coast Titans. A week later, he scored his first try for the club in a 16–32 loss to the South Sydney Rabbitohs.

After his early struggles, Opacic locked down the right centre position for the North Queensland club, playing the remaining 17 games, scoring seven tries and forming a dynamic partnership with winger Kyle Feldt.

2020
In February, Opacic was a member of the Cowboys' 2020 NRL Nines winning squad. Opacic played just five NRL games in 2020, scoring two tries, struggling to hold down a starting  position. On 3 October, the North Queensland club announced that Opacic would be departing the club at the end of the season. On 21 October, it was announced that Opacic had signed a one year deal with the Parramatta Eels.

2021
He made his debut for Parramatta in round 1 of the 2021 NRL season where the club recorded a 24-16 victory over Brisbane.

In round 4, he scored two tries for Parramatta in a 36-22 victory over the Wests Tigers at Stadium Australia.

2022
Opacic started the season with Parramatta's NSW Cup team and scored four tries in the clubs 34-6 opening round victory over St. George.  Following an injury to Sean Russell, Opacic was called into the NRL squad for the club's round 2 match against Cronulla.
On 10 August, Opacic signed a two-year deal to join English side Hull Kingston Rovers starting in 2023.
In round 24, Opacic scored two tries for Parramatta in a 53-6 victory over Brisbane.  Opacic played in Parramatta's opening two finals matches against Penrith and Canberra but suffered a hamstring injury during the clubs win over the latter opponent.  Opacic subsequently missed Parramatta's upset preliminary final victory over North Queensland and the 2022 NRL Grand Final against Penrith which Parramatta lost 28-12.

Achievements and accolades

Team
2020 NRL Nines: North Queensland Cowboys – Winners

Statistics

NRL
 Statistics are correct to the end of the 2022 season

References

External links

Parramatta Eels profile
North Queensland Cowboys profile
NRL profile

1994 births
Living people
Australian rugby league players
Australian expatriate sportspeople in England
Australian people of Serbian descent
Brisbane Broncos players
Hull Kingston Rovers players
North Queensland Cowboys players
Parramatta Eels players
Redcliffe Dolphins players
Rugby league centres
Rugby league players from Queensland
Townsville Blackhawks players